Mamadou "Futty" Danso (born April 27, 1983) is a Gambian professional footballer who plays as a centre back.

Career

College and amateur
Danso was recruited to play soccer for North Carolina Wesleyan College and also went on to play two years of college soccer at Southern Polytechnic State University, where he was a two-time All-Southern States Athletic Conference selection. Danso became SPSU’s first All-America selection in 2008, after leading the conference in scoring with 19 goals, and finished his college career with 35 goals in total.

During his college years Danso also played in the USL Premier Development League for Cary RailHawks U23s.

Professional
Danso was acquired by Major League Soccer (MLS) club D.C. United via the waiver ranking order, having left college early to turn professional, but was transferred to Portland Timbers of the USL First Division in April 2009 without ever signing a contract with MLS.

Danso made his professional debut on April 25, 2009, coming on as a late substitute in Portland's game against the Vancouver Whitecaps. He scored his first professional goal on May 24, 2009, in a 2-1 victory over the Puerto Rico Islanders. He stayed with the Timbers when they moved to MLS in 2011, playing as a defender there for three and a half seasons and helping them win the Western Conference standings and advance to the Western Conference Final in 2013. When Danso played with fellow Gambian Pa Modou Kah, the two Timbers centerbacks became known as "The Great Wall of Gambia".

In June 2014, Danso was traded to the Montreal Impact in exchange for a second-round pick in the 2015 MLS SuperDraft.

In March 2015, Danso was announced as a new signing of the Carolina Railhawks.

In January 2017, Danso was unveiled as one of Kelantan FA's import players, replacing Cédric Djeugoue who failed to be signed by the club after he had a problem with his documents.

In March 2018, Danso signed for North Carolina FC (the renamed North Carolina Railhawks). On Jan. 1, 2019 he joined the Malaysian team UiTM FC.

In August 2020, Portland Timbers 2, the USL reserve team of the Portland Timbers, announced that they had signed Danso. Timbers 2 opted to stop operating following the 2020 season.

International
On August 30, 2010, Danso was given his first chance at international play by being selected to the Gambia national football team's September 5, 2010 African Cup of Nations qualifier against Namibia.

Coaching career
In September 10, 2020, it was announced that Danso will join PDX FC to serve as the head coach for the new U21 team. For the 2021 season PDX FC moved to USL League Two from National Premier Soccer League.

Career statistics
As of 28 October 2017.

International goals
Scores and results list the Gambia's goal tally first.

Personal
Danso holds a U.S. green card which qualifies him as a domestic player for MLS roster purposes.
Danso became an American citizen in 2018 and now holds dual citizenship with The Gambia and the United States of America.

Honors

Portland Timbers
USL First Division Commissioner's Cup (1): 2009

References

External links
 
 

1983 births
Living people
Cary Clarets players
Portland Timbers (2001–2010) players
Portland Timbers players
CF Montréal players
North Carolina FC players
NC Wesleyan Battling Bishops men's soccer players
Expatriate soccer players in Canada
People from Serekunda
Expatriate soccer players in the United States
Gambian expatriate footballers
Gambian footballers
The Gambia international footballers
USL League Two players
USL First Division players
USSF Division 2 Professional League players
Major League Soccer players
North American Soccer League players
Gambian expatriate sportspeople in the United States
Gambian expatriate sportspeople in Canada
Kelantan FA players
Association football defenders
Portland Timbers 2 players
USL Championship players